Agustín Aleido Román Rodríguez (May 5, 1928 – April 11, 2012) was the Auxiliary Bishop of the Roman Catholic Archdiocese of Miami and the Titular Bishop of Sertei.

Early life and education
His parents were Rosendo Román and  Juana M. Rodríguez.  He studied philosophy at the San Alberto Magno Seminary in Matanzas and then studied theology at the Seminary of the Fathers of Foreign Missions in Montreal, Quebec, Canada.  He received a Master's in Religious Studies from Barry University and a Master's in Human Resources from St. Thomas University.

Priesthood
He was ordained a priest on July 5, 1959, and assigned to the Diocese of Matanzas.  He was assigned to the parishes of  Coliseo-Lagunillas and  Pedro Betancourt and Spiritual Director of  Juventud Católica.  He was expelled from Cuba on September 17, 1961, by the Communist regime along with another 130 priests and the Auxiliary Bishop of the Archdiocese of Havana, Eduardo Tomas Boza-Masvidal, on the Spanish ship Covadonga.

From 1962 to 1966, he was spiritual director and professor at the Institute of Humanities in Temuco, Chile.  He was also assigned to the parish of  Espíritu in Temuco.  From 1967 to 1973, he was the chaplain of Mercy Hospital in Miami, United States.

He served on the U.S. Bishops' Committee for Hispanic Affairs, and was a member of the Committee on Migration and Tourism. He was also director of the Charismatic Movement (1977-1979), member of the committee on Popular Piety, and episcopal vicar for the Spanish-speaking people of the Archdiocese (1976 – 1984).

Episcopacy
On February 6, 1979, he was appointed by Pope John Paul II as the Auxiliary Bishop of the Archdiocese of Miami; his Principal Consecrator was Miami's Archbishop, Edward Anthony McCarthy. On March 24, 1979, he was consecrated Titular Bishop of Sertei. He was the first Cuban bishop in the United States.

From 1979 to 1997, he served as executive director of the Ministry of Pastoral Service, which includes Hispanic movements, ministry to Haitians, Blacks and other cultural groups, ministry to families, youth, young adults, the sick, the handicapped, farmworkers, prisoners, and Respect Life.

From 1997 to 2003 he also served as director of the Ministry of Persons, which includes priests, religious and laity.

In December 1986, when Cuban detainees rioted in U.S. Federal Prisons in Atlanta, Georgia, and Oakdale, Louisiana, to protest their indefinite incarceration and probable deportation to Cuba, the prisoners called on Bishop Román to be the mediator for their negotiations with the federal agents. His role in ending the crisis without loss of blood earned him recognition as ABC News' Person of the Week, "a man of compassion, gentility and commitment ... a man with a strong personality and humble spirit." When the press began calling him a hero, Bishop Roman responded with characteristic humility: "A bishop, a priest, is a servant, not a hero."

Bishop Román was the principal co-consecrator of Bishop Enrique San Pedro S.J., Bishop Gilberto Fernández, Archbishop Thomas Gerard Wenski, and Bishop John Gerard Noonan.

On May 5, 2003, Bishop Román turned 75 and, as required under canon law, submitted his resignation as Auxiliary Bishop of Miami.

The National Shrine of Our Lady of Charity
Bishop Román was identified with the National Shrine of Our Lady of Charity in Miami until the very end of his mortal life.

His exhortations raised enough money to pay for the construction, which he oversaw. He remained active there, first as its Director, from 1967, and then as its Rector Emeritus, after retiring from active ministry in 2003. He was considered the principal spokesman for Catholic Cuban-American exiles.

In retirement, he spent much of his time at the shrine.

Death
It was at this shrine where, on April 11, 2012, he suffered a cardiac arrest. Transported to the neighboring Mercy Hospital, he died shortly before 8:45 p.m. at age 83, having lived 33 years as Bishop.

After a visitation and wake at the same shrine on April 12 and 13, Miami's Archbishop, Thomas Gerard Wenski, was the principal celebrant of the Funeral Mass at the Cathedral of Saint Mary on Saturday, April 14 at 1 p.m., which was followed by interment at 3 p.m. at Our Lady of Mercy Cemetery. Many Bishops and priests from the U.S. and other countries were present, including Miami's Archbishop Emeritus Favalora, the other Bishops of the Catholic Province of Miami (the state of Florida), the Apostolic Nuncio to the United States, Archbishop Carlo Maria Vigano, the Apostolic Nuncio to Haiti, Bernardito Auza, as well as Archbishop Dionisio García of the Archdiocese of Santiago de Cuba, Bishop Mario Mestril of the Diocese of Ciego de Avila, and Bishop Emilio Aranguren of the Diocese of Holguín, who were representing the Church in Cuba.

Reaction

Florida's Governor Rick Scott, Miami's Archbishop Emeritus John Clement Favalora, U.S. Representative Ileana Ros-Lehtinenoffered condolences.

Apostolic succession
The apostolic succession list: 
 Archbishop Edward Anthony McCarthy † (1965)
 Archbishop Karl Joseph Alter † (1931)
 Archbishop John Timothy McNicholas OP † (1918)
 Tommaso Pio Cardinal Boggiani OP † (1908)
 Rafael Cardinal Merry del Val y Zulueta † (1900)
 Mariano Cardinal Rampolla del Tindaro † (1882)
 Edward Henry Cardinal Howard † (1872)
 Carlo Cardinal Sacconi † (1851)
 Giacomo Filippo Cardinal Fransoni † (1822)
 Pietro Francesco Cardinal Galleffi † (1819)
 Alessandro Cardinal Mattei † (1777)
 Bernardino Cardinal Giraud † (1767)
 Pope Carlo della Torre Rezzonico † (1743)
 Pope Prospero Lorenzo Lambertini † (1724)
 Pope Pietro Francesco (Vincenzo Maria) Orsini de Gravina OP † (1675)
 Paluzzo Cardinal Paluzzi Altieri Degli Albertoni † (1666)
 Ulderico Cardinal Carpegna † (1630)
 Luigi Cardinal Caetani † (1622)
 Ludovico Cardinal Ludovisi † (1621)
 Archbishop Galeazzo Sanvitale † (1604)
 Girolamo Cardinal Bernerio OP † (1586)
 Giulio Antonio Cardinal Santorio † (1566)
 Scipione Cardinal Rebiba †

References

External links

 Archdiocese of Miami bio	
 Retired Auxiliary Bishop Agustin Roman dies at 83	
 Ermita de La Caridad - Msgr. Agustin A. Román	
 Official biography (pdf)

 

1928 births
2012 deaths
People from San Antonio de los Baños
20th-century American Roman Catholic titular bishops
Roman Catholic Archdiocese of Miami
21st-century American Roman Catholic titular bishops
20th-century Cuban Roman Catholic priests
Cuban emigrants to the United States
St. Thomas University (Florida) alumni
Barry University alumni
Religious leaders from Florida